Keshub Mahindra (born 9 October 1923) is an Indian businessman, and the chairman emeritus of the Mahindra Group. He retired as chairman in August 2012 after heading the Group for nearly five decades, handing over the position to his nephew, Anand Mahindra. Mahindra is known for his philanthropy.  He is a graduate from Wharton, University of Pennsylvania, US. He joined Mahindra & Mahindra in 1947, and in 1963 took over as chairman.

Organizations and committees
Mahindra has been appointed by the Government of India to serve on various committees, including the Sachar Commission on Company Law & MRTP, Central Advisory Council of Industries. In 1987, he was awarded the Chevalier de l'Ordre National de la Légion d'honneur by the French Government. From 2004 to 2010, he was a Member of the Prime Minister's Council on Trade & Industry, New Delhi.

Mahindra is a member of the Apex Advisory Council of ASSOCHAM and is the President Emeritus of the Employers’ Federation of India. He is an Honorary Fellow of the All India Management Association, New Delhi and a member of the Council of the United World Colleges (International) in the United Kingdom.

He is a proponent of good governance and ethics and has stated his views in several publications and forums, including in an interview for the Creating Emerging Markets project at the Harvard Business School, during which he talks about the Group's evolution into a global business group and his determination never to compromise on high ethical values.

Mahindra was awarded the Lifetime Achievement Award in 2007 by Ernst & Young. He was awarded the Frost and Sullivan Award for Leadership, Innovation and Growth in 2015.

Controversy
Mahindra had served as the non-executive chairman of Union Carbide India Limited at the time the incident took place in 1984 in which 3,787 people died in Bhopal (as per the Government of Madhya Pradesh).

In June 2010, seven former employees of the Union Carbide subsidiary, all Indian nationals and many in their 70s, were sentenced to two years imprisonment and fined . All were given bail shortly after the verdict.

References

1923 births
Living people
Mahindra Group
Businesspeople from Mumbai